Mikeschair is the first official studio album from the band Mikeschair. It was released on July 14, 2009, through Curb Records. Although the album cover features the words "Can't Take Away," the album is self-titled.

Track listing

Awards
The album was nominated for a Dove Award for Pop/Contemporary Album of the Year at the 41st GMA Dove Awards. The songs "Let the Waters Rise" and "Can't Take Away" were nominated for three Dove Awards each, including Song of the Year.

Notes

2009 debut albums
Mikeschair albums
Curb Records albums